Fotis Goudroubis (born 21 September 1995) is a Greek professional footballer who plays as a striker for Super League 2 club Apollon Larissa.

References

1995 births
Living people
Greek footballers
Football League (Greece) players
Super League Greece 2 players
Gamma Ethniki players
Apollon Larissa F.C. players
Pierikos F.C. players
Association football forwards
Footballers from Larissa